Carfizzi is an Arbëreshë comune in the Province of Crotone, Calabria, Italy.

Notes and references

Arbëresh settlements
Cities and towns in Calabria